Paattu Vaathiyar ( Music teacher) is a 1995 Tamil language romantic drama film directed by T. P. Gajendran. The film stars Ramesh Aravind and Ranjitha, with Jaishankar, Senthil, Raveendran, Ravikanth, Vetri Vigneshwar, Kovai Sarala and Raghavi playing supporting roles. It was released on 10 February 1995.

Plot

Pandian is a wealthy man in his village and the village chief, he built a school in the past. His daughter Deivanai is a joyful woman, she has more power than the school headmaster and all the teachers work under her command.

The villagers follow very orthodox customs: only those from the village can get married together and the village women are not allowed to leave the village.

Ramesh is a music teacher, he comes from the city to teach music lessons at Pandian's school. At first, when taking classes, the students tease Ramesh and they don't respect him. Ramesh slowly makes them like music. Ramesh gets into a fight with Deivanai, which leads to an ego clash between the pair. The hatred turns into love, they both fall in love secretly. In the meantime, Pechimuthu, Pandian's nephew, is back from jail after an honour killing.

In the past, the village girl Karpagam and Vetri who was from another village fell in love with each other. When their relationship had come into the limelight, Pandian punished Karpagam: being stripped in front of the villagers. But her lover tried to save her from this humiliation, and Pechimuthu brutally killed him. Afterwards, Karpagam became mentally ill and Pechimuthu was sent to jail.

Maarappan, Karpagam's brother, wants to take revenge on Pandian and Pechimuthu and he waits for the right opportunity. One day, Maarappan learns of Ramesh and Deivanai's love. What transpires later forms the crux of the story.

Cast

Ramesh Aravind as Ramesh
Ranjitha as Deivanai
Jaishankar as Pandian
Senthil as Pulipandi
Raveendran as Maarappan
Ravikanth as Pechimuthu
Vetri Vigneshwar as Vetri
Kovai Sarala as Pulipandi's wife
Raghavi as Karpagam
Kumarimuthu as washerman
Kula Deivam V. R. Rajagopal as Headmaster
Gajendra Kumar
M. R. Krishnamurthy as Tamil Teacher
Pasi Narayanan as Science Teacher
Oru Viral Krishna Rao as Swamy
Marthandan
Thavakalai as Ice Cream Seller
K. B. Kumar
N. Ramadurai
Malliswari
Uma Maheswari
Maami Jayalakshmi
Sumathi
Baby Thejesh Kumar Gourabathini
Baboos
T. P. Gajendran in a cameo appearance

Soundtrack

The film score and the soundtrack were composed by Ilaiyaraaja. The soundtrack, released in 1995, features 8 tracks with lyrics written by Vaali, Pulamaipithan, Na. Kamarasan, Piraisoodan and Ilaiyaraaja.

References

1995 films
1990s Tamil-language films
1990s romantic musical films
Indian romantic musical films
Indian romantic drama films
Films scored by Ilaiyaraaja
Films directed by T. P. Gajendran
1995 romantic drama films